The Eight-point Gallery Cafe or 8 Point Art Cafe is an art gallery and cafe situated in Kollam (Quilon) city of Kerala, India. This is the first international standard art cafe in the city of Kollam. Eight-Point is established in a renovated heritage building, ‘Parambarya,’ inside the Asramam Picnic Village campus. Famous muralist and art director Mr. Shenley had taken the Parambarya building from Kollam DTPC(District Tourism promotion Council) for five years to set-up this art cafe. The Kollam DTPC has spent nearly 2 million Indian Rupee for the renovation and setting up of properties in the museum/Paramparya building.

Now the art cafe is home for various exhibitions, performing arts and other events.

The gallery has held an exhibition on paintings by Arjun Maroli that depicts Kollam district on canvas 'KL02'. The exhibition was inaugurated by artist Anavadya.

Toponymy
The name ‘eight-point’ represents the eight creeks of Ashtamudi Lake  and the eight art forms incorporated in the gallery.

Facilities

 Gallery
 Cafe
 Theatre
 Library
 Venue for Music

Little Free Library

The first Little Free Library in Kerala is set up at 8 Point Art Cafe. The library is having 50 books in the small shelf situated at the courtyard and readers can take any book without fee by keeping another book.

See also
 Kollam
 British Residency
 Adventure Park, Kollam
 Cheena Kottaram

References

Tourist attractions in Kollam
Art museums and galleries in India
Museums established in 2015
Museums in Kollam
2015 establishments in Kerala
Contemporary art galleries in India
Art galleries established in 2015